The Vilaine is a river in Brittany, in the west of France. The river's source is in the Mayenne département (53), and it flows out into the Atlantic Ocean at Pénestin in the Morbihan département (56). It is 218 km long.

Course of the river
The river arises near the towns of Juvigné and La Croixille.  It passes through 4 départements (Mayenne, Ille-et-Vilaine, Loire-Atlantique and Morbihan) and 4 main towns (Rennes, Vitré, Redon, and La Roche-Bernard), then flows into the Bay of Biscay by Pénestin.

Three barrages were built around Vitré, Ille-et-Vilaine to alleviate flooding, while securing potable water supplies:

 1978 Valière barrage
 1982 Haute-Vilaine barrage
 1995 Villaumur barrage

They are also amenities for recreational activities.

Hydrology

The river has a flow ranging between 2 and 1500 m3/s

Navigation

The Vilaine is part of Brittany's canal system, built mainly in the 19th century for relatively small barges (130 tonnes). The entire system was transferred to the Brittany Region in 2011. In Rennes the river connects to the Canal d'Ille et Rance hence the Rance estuary, which enters the English Channel at Saint-Malo. In Redon it crosses the Canal de Nantes à Brest, giving access to Pontivy and the Blavet (west) and Nantes (east).

Main tributaries

 Ille
 Meu
 Seiche
 Semnon
 Chère
 Don
 Oust
 Isac

References

External links 
 River Vilaine navigation guide; places, ports and moorings on the river, by the author of Inland Waterways of France, Imray

 Navigation details for 80 French rivers and canals (French waterways website section)

Rivers of France
 
Rivers of Pays de la Loire
Rivers of Brittany
Rivers of Ille-et-Vilaine
Rivers of Loire-Atlantique
Rivers of Mayenne
Rivers of Morbihan